Arthur O'Sullivan (1912–1981) was an Irish actor.

Arthur O'Sullivan may also refer to:

Arthur O'Sullivan (economist) (born 1953), American professor and textbook author

See also
Arthur Sullivan (disambiguation)